In Colorado, State Highway 350 may refer to:
U.S. Route 350, the only Colorado highway numbered 350 since 1968
Colorado State Highway 350 (1938-1953) through Nucla